Thomas Green may refer to:

Academics
 Thomas Green (master) (fl. 1520s), English academic, vice-chancellor of the University of Cambridge
 Thomas F. Green (1927–2006), American educational theorist and philosopher
 T. H. Green (Thomas Hill Green, 1836–1882), English philosopher

Military
 Thomas Green (general) (1814–1864), Confederate general after whom Tom Green County, Texas was named
 Thomas H. Green (1889–1971), American military officer
 Thomas M. Green Sr. (1723–1805), colonel in the American Revolutionary War

Politics and law
 Thomas Jefferson Green (1802–1863), American politician
 Thomas M. Green Jr. (1758–1813), delegate to the United States Congress from Mississippi Territory
 Thomas Greene (governor) (1609–1651), Second Provincial Governor of Maryland

Sports
 Thomas Green (canoeist) (born 1999), Australian sprint kayaker
 Thomas D. Green (1848–1935), Canadian amateur ice hockey player

Others
 Sir Thomas Green (1461–1506), grandfather of Katherine Parr, last wife of Henry VIII
 Thomas Green (bishop) (1658–1738), English Anglican bishop of Norwich
 Thomas Green (Blessed), one of the Carthusian martyrs
 Thomas Green (captain) (1679/80–1705), English sailor and alleged pirate, hanged in Scotland
 Thomas Green (geologist) (c. 1738–1788), English geologist and Woodwardian Professor of Geology
 Thomas Green (pastor) (1761–1814), American minister
 Thomas Green (sculptor) (c.1659-1730) English sculptor
 Fred Clifton (born Thomas Huslea Green, 1844–1903), English opera singer and actor
 Thomas Louis Green (1799-1883), English Catholic priest and apologist
 Thomas R. G. Green (born 1941), British cognitive scientist

Other uses
 Thomas Green & Son, engineers who manufactured a wide range of products at the Smithfield Foundry, Leeds, United Kingdom

See also
 Tom Green (disambiguation)
 Thomas Greene (disambiguation)
 Thomas Green Clemson (1807–1888), U.S. politician
 Thom Green (born 1991), Australian dancer and actor
 Thom Sonny Green, English drummer and electronic music producer